was a Japanese Nippon Professional Baseball player. He played for the Seibu Lions and Yomiuri Giants.

In 1986, Tanabe was one of several Lions players who played on loan for the San Jose Bees. He led the club in hits, home runs, and runs batted in.

In 2002, Tanabe rejoined the Lions as a coach. He was serving as the club's hitting coach when he took over as manager in June 2014. On September 27, 2016, Tanabe announced he would resign at the end of the season.

References

External links

1966 births
Japanese expatriate baseball players in the United States
Living people
Managers of baseball teams in Japan
Nippon Professional Baseball infielders
San Jose Bees players
Seibu Lions managers
Seibu Lions players
Baseball people from Yamanashi Prefecture
Yomiuri Giants players